Stefanos Stefanopoulos (3 July 1898 – 4 October 1982) was a Greek politician, and served as Prime Minister of Greece from 1965 to 1966.

Stefanopoulos was born in Pyrgos, Elis. He was a moderate conservative, and served as a cabinet member during Alexandros Papagos' government. He even served as acting Prime Minister for a day after the latter's death on 4 October 1955.

On 17 September 1965, he became Prime Minister of Greece during the period of the "Apostasia", supported by conservatives and defecting members of the Centre Union party. Unable to gain a parliamentary vote of confidence, his government fell on 22 December 1966.

He died, aged 84, in Athens.

References

1898 births
1982 deaths
20th-century prime ministers of Greece
People from Pyrgos, Elis
United Alignment of Nationalists politicians
People's Party (Greece) politicians
Greek Rally politicians
Popular Social Party politicians
Centre Union politicians
Apostasia of 1965
Prime Ministers of Greece
Deputy Prime Ministers of Greece
Finance ministers of Greece
Foreign ministers of Greece
Greek MPs 1946–1950
Greek MPs 1950–1951
Greek MPs 1951–1952
Greek MPs 1952–1956
Greek MPs 1964–1967
Politicians from Elis
Grand Crosses 1st class of the Order of Merit of the Federal Republic of Germany